James Talmadge McIntyre Jr. (born December 17, 1940) was the director of the United States' Office of Management and Budget from September 24, 1977 until January 20, 1981.

McIntyre received his undergraduate and law degrees from the University of Georgia in 1963. He joined the Carter administration as deputy director of the Office of Management and Budget in 1977 and succeeded initial appointee Bert Lance later that year.

McIntyre was general counsel for the Georgia Municipal Association before being appointed to the position of deputy state revenue commissioner in 1970. During his time as state revenue commissioner, he was appointed director of the Office of Planning and Budget for the State by then Governor Carter. He currently serves on the board of directors of the Committee for a Responsible Federal Budget

References

External links

1940 births
Carter administration cabinet members
Directors of the Office of Management and Budget
Living people
People from Vidalia, Georgia
University of Georgia alumni
Young Harris College alumni